Shallow Grave may refer to:

Shallow Grave (1987 film), an American slasher film
Shallow Grave (1994 film), a British thriller film directed by Danny Boyle
Shallow Grave (album), a 2008 album by The Tallest Man on Earth